Windpower Monthly is a monthly business magazine owned by the Haymarket Media Group reporting on events in the global wind power sector. Publication began in 1985 and the magazine is regarded as a "veteran player" in the wind energy sector.

Typical subjects covered include renewable energy, legislation, wind turbine technology and company news. The magazine is based in London.

References

External links 
 

1985 establishments in the United Kingdom
Business magazines published in the United Kingdom
Monthly magazines published in the United Kingdom
Magazines established in 1985
Energy magazines
Magazines published in London